Zoubek (feminine Zoubková) is a Czech surname meaning literally a "little tooth". Notable people with the surname include:

 Brian Zoubek (born 1988), American basketball player
 David Zoubek, Czech footballer
 Olbram Zoubek (1926–2017), Czech sculptor and designer
 Vladimír Zoubek (1903–1995), Czech geologist

Czech-language surnames